Tanyard Run is a  long 1st order tributary to Middle Wheeling Creek in Ohio County, West Virginia.

Course 
Tanyard Run rises about 2 miles northeast of Valley Camp, West Virginia, and then flows southwest to join Middle Wheeling Creek at Twilight.

Watershed 
Tanyard Run drains  of area, receives about 41.1 in/year of precipitation, has a wetness index of 267.53, and is about 69% forested.

See also 
 List of rivers of West Virginia

References 

Rivers of Ohio County, West Virginia
Rivers of West Virginia